CHFN-FM is a First Nations community radio station that operates at 100.1 MHz (FM) in Neyaashiinigmiing, Ontario, Canada.

Owned by Chippewas of Nawash, the station was given approval by the Canadian Radio-television and Telecommunications Commission in 2003.

References

External links
CHFN radio
CHFN Website
CHFN-FM history - Canadian Communication Foundation

Hfn
Hfn
Radio stations established in 2003
2003 establishments in Ontario
Chippewas of Nawash Unceded First Nation